Carolyn Krieg  (1953) is an American mixed-media artist known for her works based in photography.

Her work is included in the collections of the Seattle Art Museum, the Northwest Museum of Arts & Culture and the Museum of Contemporary Photography.

References

1953 births
20th-century American women artists
21st-century American women artists
Living people